

Deepwater species
See the List of deep water fish of the Red Sea

Demersal species

Ambassidae
Ambassis gymnocephalus, Bald glassy
Ambassis urotaenia, Banded-tail glassy perchlet
Apistidae
Apistus carinatus, Ocellated waspfish
Aploactinidae
Cocotropus steinitzi
Ptarmus gallus
Apogonidae
Apogon gularis
Apogon hungi
Apogon micromaculatus
Apogon quadrifasciatus, Twostripe cardinal
Apogon smithi, Smith's cardinalfish
Apogon spongicolus
Cheilodipterus novemstriatus, Indian Ocean twospot cardinalfish
Cheilodipterus pygmaios
Siphamia permutata
Ariidae
Arius thalassinus, Giant seacatfish
Ariommatidae
Ariomma dollfusi
Balistidae
Abalistes stellaris, Starry triggerfish
Batrachoididae
Thalassothia cirrhosa
Belonidae
 Tylosurus choram (Rüppell, 1837) (Red Sea houndfish)
 Tylosurus crocodilus (Péron & Lesueur, 1821)
 T. c. crocodilus (Péron & Lesueur, 1821) (hound needlefish)
Blenniidae
Alloblennius jugularis, Jugular blenny
Alloblennius pictus
Alticus kirkii, Kirk's blenny
Alticus saliens, Leaping blenny
Antennablennius adenensis, Aden blenny
Antennablennius australis, Moustached rockskipper
Antennablennius hypenetes, Arabian blenny
Ecsenius dentex
Entomacrodus epalzeocheilos, Fringelip rockskipper
Hirculops cornifer, Highbrow rockskipper
Istiblennius flaviumbrinus
Istiblennius pox, Scarface rockskipper
Istiblennius unicolor, Pallid rockskipper
Omobranchus fasciolatus, Arab blenny
Omobranchus steinitzi
Parablennius cyclops
Petroscirtes ancylodon, Arabian fangblenny
Xiphasia matsubarai, Japanese snake blenny
Xiphasia setifer, Hairtail blenny
Bothidae
Bothus myriaster, Indo-Pacific oval flounder
Bothus tricirrhitus
Engyprosopon hureaui, Hureau's flounder
Engyprosopon latifrons
Engyprosopon macrolepis
Engyprosopon maldivensis, Olive wide-eyed flounder
Callionymidae
Callionymus bentuviai
Callionymus erythraeus, Smallhead dragonet
Callionymus filamentosus, Blotchfin dragonet
Callionymus gardineri, Longtail dragonet
Callionymus marleyi, Sand dragonet
Callionymus muscatensis, Muscat dragonet
Callionymus oxycephalus
Diplogrammus infulatus, Sawspine dragonet
Diplogrammus randalli
Synchiropus sechellensis
Caproidae
Antigonia indica
Carcharhinidae
Loxodon macrorhinus, Sliteye shark
Congridae
Diploconger polystigmatus
Gorgasia cotroneii
Gorgasia sillneri
Heteroconger balteatus
Uroconger lepturus, Slender conger
Creediidae
Limnichthys nitidus, Sand submarine
Cynoglossidae
Cynoglossus arel, Largescale tonguesole
Cynoglossus bilineatus, Fourlined tonguesole
Cynoglossus dollfusi
Cynoglossus gilchristi, Ripplefin tonguesole
Cynoglossus kopsii, Shortheaded tonguesole
Cynoglossus lachneri, Lachner's tonguesole
Cynoglossus lingua, Long tongue sole
Cynoglossus pottii
Cynoglossus sealarki
Cyprinodontidae
Aphanius dispar dispar
Dactylopteridae
Dactyloptena peterseni, Starry flying gurnard
Dasyatidae
Dasyatis bennetti, Bennett's stingray
Himantura gerrardi, Sharpnose stingray
Himantura imbricata, Scaly whipray
Gerreidae
Gerres filamentosus, Whipfin silverbiddy
Gobiesocidae
Lepadichthys erythraeus
Gobiidae
Amblyeleotris triguttata, Triplespot shrimpgoby
Amblygobius magnusi
Amoya signatus, Tusk goby
Arcygobius baliurus
Callogobius amikami
Callogobius dori
Callogobius flavobrunneus, Slimy goby
Coryogalops anomolus, Anomalous goby
Coryphopterus humeralis
Cryptocentroides arabicus, Arabian goby
Favonigobius reichei, Indo-Pacific tropical sand goby
Fusigobius maximus
Gobius koseirensis
Gobius leucomelas
Hetereleotris diademata
Hetereleotris vulgaris, Common goby
Opua elati
Pleurosicya prognatha
Pomatoschistus marmoratus, Marbled goby
Psilogobius randalli
Silhouettea aegyptia, Red Sea goby
Silhouettea chaimi
Silhouettea insinuans, Phantom goby
Trimma filamentosus
Gymnuridae
Gymnura poecilura, Longtail butterfly ray
Haemulidae
Plectorhinchus faetela
Pomadasys argenteus, Silver grunt
Pomadasys hasta
Pomadasys multimaculatum, Cock grunter
Pomadasys punctulatus, Lined grunt
Hemigaleidae
Hemipristis elongata, Snaggletooth shark
Holocentridae
Sargocentron marisrubri
Kraemeriidae
Kraemeria nuda
Labridae
Cheilinus abudjubbe
Pteragogus pelycus, Sideburn wrasse
Suezichthys caudavittatus, Spottail wrasse
Suezichthys russelli, Russell's wrasse
Xyrichtys bimaculatus, Two-spot razorfish
Xyrichtys javanicus
Xyrichtys niger
Leiognathidae
Gazza minuta, Toothpony
Leiognathus berbis, Berber ponyfish
Leiognathus bindus, Orangefin ponyfish
Leiognathus elongatus, Slender ponyfish
Leiognathus equulus, Common ponyfish
Leiognathus fasciatus, Striped ponyfish
Leiognathus klunzingeri
Leiognathus leuciscus, Whipfin ponyfish
Leiognathus lineolatus, Ornate ponyfish
Leiognathus splendens, Splendid ponyfish
Secutor insidiator, Pugnose ponyfish
Secutor ruconius, Deep pugnose ponyfish
Liparidae
Liparis fishelsoni
Lophiidae
Lophiomus setigerus, Blackmouth angler
Lutjanidae
Pristipomoides multidens, Goldbanded jobfish
Malacanthidae
Branchiostegus sawakinensis, Freckled tilefish
Hoplolatilus oreni
Microdesmidae
Paragunnellichthys springeri
Brachaluteres baueri
Paraluteres arqat
Paramonacanthus frenatus, Wedgetail filefish
Paramonacanthus oblongus, Hair-finned filefish
Paramonacanthus pusillus
Stephanolepis diaspros, Reticulated leatherjacket
Mugilidae
Liza macrolepis, Largescale mullet
Liza subviridis, Greenback mullet
Liza tade, Tade mullet
Valamugil cunnesius, Longarm mullet
Mullidae
Upeneus pori, Por's goatfish
Upeneus sulphureus, Sulphur goatfish
Muraenesocidae
Congresox talabonoides, Indian pike conger
Muraenesox cinereus, Daggertooth pike conger
Muraenidae
Gymnothorax angusticauda
Gymnothorax herrei
Gymnothorax johnsoni, Whitespotted moray
Gymnothorax tile
Uropterygius genie
Uropterygius golanii
Narcinidae
Heteronarce bentuviai, Elat electric ray
Nemipteridae
Nemipterus bipunctatus, Delagoa threadfin bream
Nemipterus japonicus, Japanese threadfin bream
Nemipterus peronii, Notchedfin threadfin bream
Nemipterus randalli, Randall's threadfin bream
Nemipterus zysron, Slender threadfin bream
Parascolopsis aspinosa, Smooth dwarf monocle bream
Parascolopsis eriomma, Rosy dwarf monocle bream
Parascolopsis inermis, Unarmed dwarf monocle bream
Parascolopsis townsendi, Scaly dwarf monocle bream
Nettastomatidae
Saurenchelys lateromaculatus
Ophichthidae
Myrophis microchir
Skythrenchelys lentiginosa
Yirrkala tenuis, Thin sand-eel
Ophidiidae
Ophidion smithi
Sirembo jerdoni, Brown-banded cusk-eel
Opistognathidae
Stalix davidsheni
Paralichthyidae
Pseudorhombus arsius, Largetooth flounder
Pseudorhombus elevatus, Deep flounder
Pempheridae
Pempheris mangula, Black-edged sweeper
Pinguipedidae
Parapercis robinsoni, Smallscale grubfish
Parapercis simulata
Parapercis somaliensis, Somali sandperch
Platycephalidae
Grammoplites suppositus, Spotfin flathead
Platycephalus micracanthus
Rogadius asper, Olive-tailed flathead
Rogadius pristiger, Thorny flathead
Sorsogona prionota, Blackblotch flathead
Plesiopidae
Plesiops mystaxus, Moustache longfin
Polynemidae
Polydactylus plebeius, Striped threadfin
Polydactylus sextarius, Blackspot threadfin
Pomacentridae
Chromis axillaris, Grey chromis
Neopomacentrus taeniurus, Freshwater demoiselle
Neopomacentrus miryae
Priacanthidae
Priacanthus sagittarius, Arrow bulleye
Pristidae
Pristis zijsron, Longcomb sawfish
Psettodidae
Psettodes erumei, Indian spiny turbot
Pseudochromidae
Chlidichthys auratus
Chlidichthys rubiceps
Ptereleotridae
Ptereleotris arabica
Rhinobatidae
Rhinobatos granulatus, Sharpnose guitarfish
Rhinobatos schlegelii, Yellow guitarfish
Scott Salmon
Samaridae
Samaris cristatus, Cockatoo righteye flounder
Scorpaenidae
Brachypterois serrulata
Scorpaenodes steinitzi
Serranidae
Epinephelus epistictus, Dotted grouper
Epinephelus latifasciatus, Striped grouper
Epinephelus radiatus, Oblique-banded grouper
Serranus cabrilla, Comber
Soleidae
Aseraggodes sinusarabici
Aseraggodes steinitzi
Brachirus orientalis, Oriental sole
Solea elongata, Elongate sole
Synaptura commersonnii, Commerson's sole
Sparidae
Acanthopagrus berda, Picnic seabream
Acanthopagrus latus, Yellowfin seabream
Argyrops megalommatus
Argyrops spinifer, King soldierbream
Crenidens crenidens, Karenteen seabream
Lithognathus mormyrus, Striped seabream
Synanceiidae
Choridactylus multibarbus, Orangebanded stingfish
Minous coccineus, Onestick stingfish
Minous inermis, Alcock's scorpionfish
Minous monodactylus, Grey stingfish
Synanceia nana, Red Sea stonefish
Syngnathidae
Dunckerocampus boylei, Broad-banded Pipefish
Hippichthys cyanospilos, Blue-spotted pipefish
Hippichthys spicifer, Bellybarred pipefish
Hippocampus fuscus, Sea pony
Hippocampus jayakari, Jayakar's seahorse
Hippocampus lichtensteinii, Lichtenstein's seahorse
Lissocampus bannwarthi
Siokunichthys herrei
Syngnathus macrophthalmus
Syngnathus safina
Trachyrhamphus longirostris
Synodontidae
Synodus hoshinonis, Blackear lizardfish
Synodus macrops, Triplecross lizardfish
Terapontidae
Terapon jarbua, Jarbua terapon
Tetraodontidae
Lagocephalus lunaris, Green rough-backed puffer
Lagocephalus spadiceus, Half-smooth golden pufferfish
Tetrarogidae
Vespicula bottae
Torpedinidae
Torpedo panthera, Panther electric ray
Torpedo suessii
Triakidae
Mustelus mosis, Arabian smooth-hound
Trichonotidae
Trichonotus nikii
Triglidae
Lepidotrigla bispinosa, Bullhorn gurnard
Lepidotrigla spiloptera, Spotwing gurnard
Tripterygiidae
Enneapterygius clarkae, Barred triplefin
Enneapterygius destai
Enneapterygius obscurus
Enneapterygius pusillus, Highcrest triplefin
Helcogramma obtusirostris, Hotlips triplefin
Uranoscopidae
Uranoscopus bauchotae
Uranoscopus dahlakensis
Uranoscopus dollfusi, Dollfus' stargazer
Uranoscopus fuscomaculatus
Uranoscopus guttatus
Uranoscopus oligolepis

Pelagic species
Alopiidae
Alopias vulpinus, Thintail thresher
Belonidae
Platybelone argalus platura
Tylosurus choram, Red Sea houndfish
Bregmacerotidae
Bregmaceros arabicus
Bregmaceros mcclellandi, Spotted codlet
Bregmaceros nectabanus, Smallscale codlet
Carangidae
Alepes vari, Herring scad
Carangoides ciliarius
Caranx sansun
Decapterus macarellus, Mackerel scad
Chirocentridae
Chirocentrus nudus, Whitefin wolf-herring
Clupeidae
Amblygaster leiogaster, Smooth-belly sardinella
Dussumieria acuta, Rainbow sardine
Dussumieria elopsoides, Slender rainbow sardine
Etrumeus teres, Round herring
Herklotsichthys lossei, Gulf herring
Herklotsichthys punctatus, Spotback herring
Hilsa kelee, Kelee shad
Sardinella longiceps, Indian oil sardine
Spratelloides gracilis, Silver-stripe round herring
Coryphaenidae
Coryphaena equiselis, Pompano dolphinfish
Coryphaena hippurus, Common dolphinfish
Echeneidae
Remora brachyptera, Spearfish remora
Remorina albescens, White suckerfish
Elopidae
Elops machnata, Tenpounder
Engraulidae
Engraulis encrasicolus, European anchovy
Stolephorus indicus, Indian anchovy
Thryssa setirostris, Longjaw thryssa
Exocoetidae
Cheilopogon cyanopterus, Margined flyingfish
Cheilopogon pinnatibarbatus altipennis, Smallhead flyingfish
Cypselurus oligolepis, Largescale flyingfish
Exocoetus volitans, Tropical two-wing flyingfish
Hirundichthys rondeletii, Black wing flyingfish
Hirundichthys socotranus
Parexocoetus brachypterus, Sailfin flyingfish
Parexocoetus mento, African sailfin flyingfish
Hemiramphidae
Euleptorhamphus viridis, Ribbon halfbeak
Hemiramphus marginatus, Yellowtip halfbeak
Hyporhamphus xanthopterus, Red-tipped halfbeak
Istiophoridae
Istiophorus platypterus, Indo-Pacific sailfish
Makaira indica, Black marlin
Tetrapturus audax, Striped marlin
Lactariidae
Lactarius lactarius, False trevally
Leiognathidae
Leiognathus oblongus, Oblong ponyfish
Malacanthidae
Hoplolatilus geo
Molidae
Mola mola, Ocean sunfish
Ranzania laevis, Slender sunfish
Monodactylidae
Monodactylus argenteus, Silver moony
Mugilidae
Liza carinata, Keeled mullet
Myliobatidae
Manta ehrenbergii
Mobula thurstoni, Smoothtail mobula
Rhincodontidae
Rhincodon typus, Whale shark
Scombridae
Auxis rochei rochei, Bullet tuna
Auxis thazard thazard, Frigate tuna
Euthynnus affinis, Kawakawa
Katsuwonus pelamis, Skipjack tuna
Rastrelliger kanagurta, Indian mackerel
Sarda orientalis, Striped bonito
Scomber japonicus, Chub mackerel
Scomberomorus commerson, Narrow-barred Spanish mackerel
Thunnus albacares, Yellowfin tuna
Thunnus tonggol, Longtail tuna
Serranidae
Plectranthias klausewitzi
Sphyraenidae
Sphyraena chrysotaenia, Yellowstripe barracuda
Saurida macrolepis
Xiphiidae
Xiphias gladius, Swordfish

Reef-associated species
See the List of reef fish of the Red Sea

See also
List of red sea sharks

References
Fishbase

'